The Fort Dumoine was a trading post built under the French regime in New France and located at the confluence of the Dumoine River and the Ottawa River, northwest side. This location is now in South-East part of Zec Dumoine, in Pontiac Regional County Municipality, in Outaouais region, in province of Quebec, in Canada.

Its purpose was to facilitate trade with the Anishinaabe and to protect them against the raids of the Iroquois. The fort was built on a place of meeting and exchange used for a long time by the Atikamekw, Hurons, and other North Amerindian nations.

In 1762, Alexander Henry passed through the mouth of the Dumoine, en route to Sault Ste-Marie. He noted that 

Abandoned, the Fort Dumoine resumed its activities, thanks to the North West Company in 1784. The 1801 map by Alexander Mackenzie [4] indicates the course of the Du Moine river but does not go back to its source.

In 1811, it became the property of the Hudson's Bay Company and did not cease its activities until 1860 because of the logging companies which, by destroying wildlife habitats, almost destroyed the beavers. The site was completely flooded by Holden Lake, following the construction of the Des Joachims dam from 1946.

See also 
 List of French forts in North America

Notes and references 

French forts in Canada